Locust Mount is an unincorporated community and census-designated place (CDP) in Accomack County, Virginia, United States. It was first listed as a CDP in the  2020 census with a population of 52. The CDP is in southeastern Accomack County, on the north side of Virginia State Route 180 (Wachapreague Road), which leads east  to Wachapreague and west  to U.S. Route 13 at Keller.

Geography
It sits at an elevation of 7 feet.

Demographics

2020 census

Note: the US Census treats Hispanic/Latino as an ethnic category. This table excludes Latinos from the racial categories and assigns them to a separate category. Hispanics/Latinos can be of any race.

References

External links
Newspaper articles mentioning Locust Mount, 1883-1898, at The Countryside Transformed: The Railroad and the Eastern Shore of Virginia 1870 - 1935 (University of Virginia / Eastern Shore Public Library)

Populated places in Accomack County, Virginia
Census-designated places in Accomack County, Virginia
Census-designated places in Virginia
Unincorporated communities in Virginia
Unincorporated communities in Accomack County, Virginia